The BSA W33-7 was a British motorcycle made by BSA at their factory in Small Heath, Birmingham in 1933.

Development
The BSA W33-7 was a 499cc 4.99 hp over head valve single cylinder four stroke.  The full duplex cradle frame had fixings for a sidecar fitted as standard. The fuel tank was chrome plated with green side panels. The 6 volt electrical switches and ammeter were mounted in the middle of the top of the fuel tank.  Only produced in 1933 it was replaced by the BSA W33-8 BSA Blue Star in the same year.

References

External links
 Pictures of 1933 W33-7

W33-7
Motorcycles introduced in the 1930s